Moondyne can refer to a number of things:

Moondyne, a novel written in 1879 by John Boyle O'Reilly, and later made into a feature film of the same name
Joseph Bolitho Johns, better known as Moondyne Joe, a bushranger from Western Australia 
Moondyne Cave, a cave in the south-west of Western Australia near Augusta discovered and used by Johns